Saccolabiopsis rectifolia, commonly known as the tiny pitcher orchid, is an epiphytic orchid from the family Orchidaceae. It has a short stem, thin roots, between three and six crowded leaves and up to fifteen cup-shaped green flowers with a white, purple spotted labellum. It grows on the thinnest outer branches of rainforest trees in tropical North Queensland, Australia.

Description
Flowering occurs from June to August.

Taxonomy and naming
The tiny pitcher orchid was first formally described in 1967 by Alick William Dockrill and given the name Robiquetia rectifolia. The description was published in Australasian Sarcanthinae. In 1972, Leslie Andrew Garay changed the name to Saccolabiopsis rectifolia. The specific epithet (rectifolia) is derived from the Latin words rectus meaning "straight", "upright", "proper" or "right" and folia meaning "leaves".

Distribution and habitat
Saccolabiopsis rectifolia grows on the thinnest outer branches of rainforest trees between the Russell and Johnstone Rivers in Queensland.

References

Aeridinae
Epiphytic orchids
Endemic orchids of Australia
Orchids of Queensland
Plants described in 1967